Ricky "Ric Rude" Lewis (born May 31, 1981 in Los Angeles, California, United States) is an American songwriter, record producer, and musician.

References

Living people
1981 births
American male rappers
Songwriters from California
American male songwriters